In chemistry, a boranylium ion is an inorganic cation with the chemical formula , where R represents a non-specific substituent. Being electron-deficient, boranylium ions form adducts with Lewis bases. Boranylium ions have historical names that depend on the number of coordinated ligands:
: borinium
: borenium
: boronium

Borenium ions

A borenium ion is an inorganic cation with the chemical formula . In this class of molecules, the electron-deficient boron center has two valence electrons involved in sigma bonding with two ligands, while the third ligand is a two-electron donor such that the overall charge of the complex is +1. Depending on the nature of the ligands around the central boron, this positive charge can be localized on the boron center or delocalized across the entire molecule. Borenium ions can be made in a number of different ways and are of interest for applications in organic synthesis and catalysis.

Synthesis
Synthetic methods for preparing borenium ions include halide abstraction, nucleophilic dissociation, and protic addition to aminoboranes.

Halide or hydride abstraction

Borenium ions can be made from tetracoordinate Lewis acid-base adducts of boron halides. In this method, halide abstraction by a Lewis acid such as AlCl3 results in a borenium cation and AlCl4− anion. The first borenium ion to be isolated and characterized was made by Ryschkewitsch and Wiggins in 1970 using this method. They found that aluminium chloride dissolved in dichloromethane in the presence of the adduct of 4-methylpyridine and BCl3. A positive charge on boron was then inferred from proton NMR spectroscopy.

Similar to the halide abstraction method, borenium ions can be made through abstraction of a hydride from a tetracoordinate boron complex.

Nucleophilic dissociation

Displacement of a ligand from a neutral tricoordinate boron halide by a neutral donor such as pyridine results in the generation of a borenium cation. For this reaction to yield the desired borenium cation, the ligand must be a good leaving group and the neutral donor must have enough steric bulk that nucleophilic dissociation is favored over Lewis acid-base adduct formation with the neutral BR3 starting material, as demonstrated by competition experiments.

Protic addition to aminoboranes

Aminoboranes can be protonated by various acids to make borenium ions. This synthetic method was developed in 1983 by Narula and Noth who used triflic acid to protonate 1,3-dimethyl-2-(dimethylamino)-1,3,2-diazaborolidine; however, they were unable to crystallize and structurally characterize this particular cation.

Protonation of non-Lewis acidic oxazaborolidines results in the generation of borenium ions that can be used as enantioselective Diels–Alder catalysts. These N-protonated borenium species have been characterized by NMR.

Other methods
Borenium ions can also be made through other methods such as the addition of base to a dicoordinate borinium ion or by metathesis with salts with weakly coordinating anions such as Ag[Al[OC(CF3)3]4] or Li[Al[OC(CF3)3]4].

Structure and electronics
A number of borenium ions have been structurally characterized through x-ray crystallography. The structures of borenium ions generally have two short bonds and one longer bond which is characteristic of a dative bond. The electron-deficient nature of the boron center of many borenium ions has been confirmed by computational and experimental studies. A Natural Population Analysis treatment of many borenium ions show that the boron center does indeed carry a significant positive charge. For example, the BH2NH3+ cation has a natural charge of +0.687 on boron.

Depending on the nature of the ligands around the central boron, this positive charge can be localized on the boron center or delocalized across the entire molecule. In some cases, pi-donating ligands arranged in the plane of the boron's empty p orbital can act to stabilize the electron deficiency of the boron. Density functional theory (DFT) calculations of isolable borenium ions show that the strongly Lewis acidic boron can be stabilized by pi-donation from aromatic substituents such as pyridine.

N-heterocyclic carbenes (NHCs) can also be used to stabilize borenium ions through pi-conjugation, albeit acting as weaker pi-donors than neutral N-donors. The interaction energy between a BH2+ fragment and various NHCs has been calculated using the extended transition state method for energy decomposition analysis combined with the natural orbitals for chemical valence (NOCV) theory. This analysis showed a net pi-donating effect of the NHC ligand – in this case, the positive charge is delocalized over the entire pi system rather than localized on the boron.

In other cases the dative ligand has been observed to be twisted out of the BR3 plane due to steric crowding. This nonplanar geometry leads to a reduction in pi-donation to the boron center, making it even more electron-deficient. It has been found that increased localization of charge on the boron increases the Lewis acidity of the borocation. The Gutmann–Beckett method has been used by many researchers in this field to benchmark the Lewis acidities of these cations.

Early crystal structures of borenium cations indicate that the corresponding anion is non-coordinating. Further studies have shown that the reactivity of borocations is highly tied to the identity of its counter ion. In catalytic applications, weakly coordinating anions have allowed for the most active borenium catalysts. A commonly used counter ion for borenium cations is tetrakis(pentafluorophenyl)borate, B(C6F5)4−; however, other counterions such as AlCl4−, halides, and triflate are also possible. The synthetic viability of a borenium ion is often determined by its reactivity relative to its counterion. Halides are often unable to stabilize borenium ions, preferring instead to coordinate to the boron center to make a tetracoordinate species. A systematic evaluation of counterion effects on the synthetic viability of NHC-dicholoroborenium ions was conducted by Muthaiah and coworkers in 2013.

Reactivity and applications
Borenium ions are highly Lewis acidic. Their Lewis acidity is of the boron atom is determined by the electronic and steric effects of its ligands.

Hydrogen activation and FLP chemistry

N-heterocyclic carbene (NHC)-stabilized borenium ions have been demonstrated to be potent metal-free H2 activation and hydrogenation catalysts. Unlike the neutral boranes typically used in frustrated Lewis pair (FLP) chemistry of this type, borenium ions are inherently electrophilic and do not require electron-withdrawing ligands to perform these small-molecule activations. Because electron-withdrawing substituents can hamper hydride delivery during hydrogenation catalysis, borenium ions can be more potent catalysts than neutral boron species because they are effective hydride donors. Indeed, in 2012, Stephan and coworkers were able to develop a borenium-based FLP system capable of activating H2 stoichiometrically in the presence of phosphine.

In 2015, Devillard et al. synthesized a naphthyl-bridged intramolecular borenium-containing FLP capable of activating H2 with concomitant hydrogenolysis of a mesityl ligand. A second-order perturbation theory analysis of the natural bond orbitals (NBOs) of the intermediate in this reaction involved with H2 activation showed a 281.8 kcal/mol interaction between the sigma bond of H2 and the 2p orbital of the cationic boron.

Borenium ions have also been used catalytically for various hydrogenations. Stephan and coworkers were able to use a borenium ion catalyst to activate H2 catalytically to be used for imine hydrogenation. A similar NHC-stabilized borenium ion was used to catalyze the enantioselective reduction of ketimines. In this example, enantioselectivity was afforded through the use of a chiral NHC ligand.

It has been shown that the steric and electronic properties of the NHC ligand used in these borenium catalysts is of great importance to catalytic activity: NHCs that were too bulky prevented intermolecular hydride delivery and ligands that were highly electron donating weakened the borenium cation's ability to act as a Lewis acid.

Enantioselective catalysis
Borenium ions have been used as metal-free enantioselective catalysts for a number of organic transformations. An early example of such is the Corey–Itsuno reduction. One proposed mechanism for this enantioselective reduction involves the in situ generation of a borenium-like species using BH3 as a Lewis acid.

Further work on borenium ions generated from neutral oxazaborolidines has expanded the scope of their applications. In 2002, it was reported by E. J. Corey and coworkers that N-protonation of non-Lewis acidic oxazaborolidines results in the generation of borenium ions which can catalyze the enantioselective Diels–Alder reaction of 1,3-dienes with 2-methacrolein or 2-bromoacrolein. This particular borenium ion could be made in situ by protonating a neutral oxazaborolidine with triflic acid. Corey and coworkers suggest that the stereoselectivity of this reaction is a result of aldehyde-catalyst association in the pre-transition state which governs stereoselectivity. The use of borenium ions as Diels–Alder catalysts has been further extended to the use of borenium ionic liquids as catalysts for the Diels–Alder reaction by Matuszek et al. in 2017.

Electrophilic aromatic borylation
Borenium ions have also been implicated as intermediates in electrophilic aromatic borylation reactions. In many examples of this reaction, a catalyst is used to activate a borane, producing a highly reactive borenium ion. The formation of this highly electrophilic species drives the formation of the Wheland intermediate, a key step in the electrophilic aromatic addition mechanism. wIn 2013, Stahl et al. used a ruthenium(II) thiolate catalyst to generate borenium ions capable of effecting direct borylation of nitrogen-containing heterocycles.

In 2017, Oestreich and coworkers developed a metal-free method for effecting this transformation. In their work, B(C6H5)3 was used to activate catecholborane, generating a borenium ion capable of borylating various electron-rich heterocycles.

Hydroboration
The electrophilicity of borenium ions can drive the trans-hydroboration of alkynes. In 2016, McGough et al. were able to successfully accomplish metal-free trans-hydroboration with a variety of arylacetylene substrates using a borenium ion electrophile and B(C6F5)3 as a catalyst.

Polymerization catalysis
Borenium ions have been shown to form ionic liquids capable of catalyzing the polymerization of polyalphaolefins (PAOs). While not yet widely adopted by industry, this technology could provide an alternative to the use of BF3, a toxic and corrosive gas, in the industrial synthesis of PAOs.

Borinium cations
Borinium ions have the formula [BX2]+, where X− is usual a bulky amide (R2N−). They have linear geometry at boron and are coordinatively unsaturated.

Boronium cations
Boronium ions have the formula [L2BR2]+ (L = Lewis base). Boronium ions are tetrahedral and coordinatively saturated.

A well-known example is [(H3N)2BH2]+. Reaction of diborane with ammonia mainly gives [H2B(NH3)2]+(BH4)−.

Related boron cations
Other non-classical boron cations are mononuclear boron di- and tri-cations with formula [L3BX]2+ and [L4B]3+, respectively.

Other reported boron cations are dibora-dications (bis(borenium) dications), some examples are depicted below.

References

Boron compounds